Lwów Voivodeship was an administrative unit of interwar Poland (1918–1939). Because of the Nazi-Soviet invasion of Poland in accordance with the secret Molotov–Ribbentrop Pact, it became occupied by both the Wehrmacht and the Red Army in September 1939. Following the conquest of Poland however, the Polish underground administration existed there until August 1944. Only around half of the Voivodeship was returned to Poland after the war ended. It was split diagonally just east of Przemyśl; with its eastern half, including Lwów itself, ceded to the Ukrainian SSR at the insistence of Joseph Stalin during the Tehran Conference confirmed (as not negotiable) at the Yalta Conference of 1945.

Population
Voivodeship's capital, the biggest and its most important city was Lwów (now: Lviv in Ukraine). It consisted of 27 powiats (counties), 58 towns and 252 villages. In 1921 it was inhabited by 2,789,000 people. Ten years later, this number rose to 3,126,300 (which made it the most populous of all Polish Voivodeships). In 1931, the population density was 110 per km2. The majority of the population (57%) was Polish, especially in western counties. Ukrainians (mainly in the east and south-east) made up about 33% and Jews (mainly in towns) - around 7%. Also, there were smaller communities of Armenians, Germans and other nationalities. In 1931, the illiteracy rate of the Voivodeship's population was 23.1%, about the same as national average and, at the same time, the lowest in the Polish Eastern Borderlands.

Location and area
It was located in southern Poland, bordering Czechoslovakia to the south, Kraków Voivodeship to the west, Lublin Voivodeship to the north and Volhynian Voivodeship, Stanisławów Voivodeship and Tarnopol Voivodeship to the east. Landscape was hilly (in the north) and mountainous (in the south, along the Czechoslovakian border, with numerous spas located there, such as Slawsko). Forest covered 23.3% of the Voivodeship area (January 1, 1937 statistics; with the national average of 22.2%).

Cities and counties
Lwów, the voivodeship's capital, was by far its biggest city, with the population of 318,000 (as of 1939). It was also the biggest city in south-eastern Poland and the third biggest city in the country (after Warsaw and Łódź), before Kraków (259,000). Other important centers in the voivodeship were: Przemyśl (in 1931 pop. 51,000), Borysław (pop. 41,500), Drohobycz (pop. 32,300), Rzeszów (pop. 27,000), Jarosław (pop. 22,200), Sambor (pop. 22,000), Sanok (pop. 14,300) and Gródek Jagielloński (pop. 12,900).

Counties of the Lwów Voivodeship

 Bobrka county (area 891 km2 pop. 97 100),
 Brzozów county (area 684 km2 pop. 83 200),
 Dobromil county (area 994 km2 pop. 94 000),
 Drohobycz county (area 1,499 km2 pop. 194 400),
 Gródek Jagielloński county (area 889 km2 pop. 85 000),
 Jarosław county (area 1,337 km2 pop. 148 000),
 Jaworów county (area 977 km2 pop. 86 800),
 Kolbuszowa county (area 873 km2 pop. 69 600),
 Krosno county (area 934 km2 pop. 113 400),
 Lesko county (area 1,832 km2 pop. 111 600),
 Lubaczów county (area 1,146 km2 87 300),
 city of Lwów county (powiat lwowski grodzki - area 67 km2, pop. 312 200),
 Lwów county (area 1,276 km2 pop. 142 800),
 Łańcut county (area 889 km2 pop. 97 700),
 Mościska county (area 755 km2 pop. 89 500),
 Nisko county (area 973 km2 pop. 64 200),
 Przemyśl county (area 1,002 km2 pop. 162 500),
 Przeworsk county (area 415 km2 pop. 61 400),
 Rawa Ruska county (area 1,401 km2 pop. 122 100),
 Rudki county (area 670 km2 pop. 79 200),
 Rzeszów county (area 1,270 km2 pop. 185 100),
 Sambor county (area 1,133 km2 pop. 133 800),
 Sanok county (area 1,282 km2 pop. 114 200),
 Sokal county (area 1,324 km2 pop. 109 100),
 Tarnobrzeg county (area 949 km2 pop. 72 200),
 Turka county (area 1,829 km2 pop. 114 400),
 Żółkiew county (area 1,111 km2 pop. 95 500).

Railroads and industry
Interwar Poland was unofficially divided into two parts - Poland "A" (better developed) and Poland "B" (less developed). Lwów Voivodeship was located on the boundary line of these, with two main centres - the city of Lwów itself and the rich in oil southern region of Borysław and Drohobycz.

Starting in the mid-1930s, the Polish government decided to start a massive public works project, known as Centralny Okreg Przemyslowy (COP). The project covered western counties of the Voivodeship, where several factories were constructed (a steel mill in newly created city of Stalowa Wola, an aircraft engine and artillery factory in Rzeszów, as well as an armament factory in Sanok). This was a huge boost for overpopulated rural areas, where unemployment was high.  The project was still incomplete at the beginning of the Second World War.

The railroad network was well-developed only in the area of Lwów, as the city itself was an important hub with as many as eight lines coming from it. Apart from this, some counties (like Kolbuszowa, Brzozów or Jaworów) lacked rail connections, while others (Lesko, Lubaczów, Rudki, Stary Sambor) were greatly underdeveloped. Other rail hubs were Rawa Ruska, Rzeszów, Rozwadów, Sambor, Drohobycz, Przeworsk, Chodorów, and Przemyśl.

As for January 1, 1938, total length of railroads within Voivodeship's boundaries was 1,534 kilometers, which was 5.4 km. per 100 km2.

Voivodes
 Kazimierz Grabowski, 23 April 1921 – 30 June 1924
 Stanisław Zimny, 10 March 1924 – 4 December 1924
 Paweł Garapich, 30 December 1924 – 28 July 1927
 Piotr Dunin-Borkowski, 28 July 1927 – 30 April 1928
 Wojciech Agenor Gołuchowski, 9 July 1928 – 29 August 1930
 Bronisław Nakoniecznikoff-Klukowski, 29 August 1930 – 6 July 1931
 Józef Rożniecki, 22 July 1931 – 30 January 1933
 Władysław Belina-Prażmowski, 31 January 1933 – 14 April 1937
 Alfred Biłyk, 16 April 1937 – 17 September 1939

September 1939 and its aftermath
Following the Molotov–Ribbentrop Pact and the subsequent Russo-German conquest of Poland, the voivodeship was divided by the victors in late September 1939. The western part of the voivodeship was annexed by Germany and added to the General Government, while the eastern part (including the city of Lwów) was incorporated into the Ukrainian Soviet Socialist Republic. After July 1941, Lwów and the eastern part were occupied by Germany and also added to the General Government; the Polish underground administration existed there until August 1944. In 1945, when Poland's current borders were established, the western part of former Lwów Voivodeship (to the San river) was organized into the newly created Rzeszów Voivodeship; this territory has been part of the Subcarpathian Voivodeship since 1999.

The remaining eastern part became Ukraine's Lviv Oblast.

References

 Maly rocznik statystyczny 1939, Nakladem Glownego Urzedu Statystycznego, Warszawa 1939 (Concise Statistical Year-Book of Poland, Warsaw 1939).

 
Former voivodeships of the Second Polish Republic
Geographic history of Ukraine
History of Lviv Oblast
History of Lesser Poland
History of Red Ruthenia
History of Eastern Galicia